Gudmund Skjeldal (born 4 September 1970) is a Norwegian cross-country skier and writer.

He competed in the World Cup between 1991 and 1995. In March 1991 he finished eighth in the 50 kilometres in Oslo. He finished second in the same race two years later, and fourth over 15 kilometres in Štrbské Pleso later in March 1993.

He is the brother of Kristen Skjeldal, and was born in Voss. He holds the cand.philol. degree with a major in the history of ideas. He has worked as a school teacher, and wrote the books På villspor (1995) and Den siste langrennaren (2005), the latter a portrait of his brother. He fronts the environmental campaign Hvit Vinter ('White Winter').

Cross-country skiing results
All results are sourced from the International Ski Federation (FIS).

World Cup

Season standings

Individual podiums
1 podium

References 

1970 births
Living people
Norwegian male cross-country skiers
People from Voss
Norwegian non-fiction writers
Norwegian environmentalists